The 2014 Tulane Green Wave football team represented Tulane University in the 2014 NCAA Division I FBS football season. They were led by third-year head coach Curtis Johnson and played home games at Yulman Stadium. They were in their first year of membership in the American Athletic Conference, and it was the Green Wave's first season on its Uptown campus since the 1974 season. They finished the season 3–9, 2–6 in AAC play to finish in a tie for eighth place.

Pre-season

Recruits

Award watch lists
Lorenzo Doss
 Walter Camp Award Watch List 
 Chuck Bednarik Award Watch List
 Bronko Nagurski Trophy Watch List
 Jim Thorpe Award Watch List
 College Football Performance Award (CFPA) Defensive Back Trophy Watch List

Roster

Schedule

Source

Game summaries

Tulsa

UCF

Cincinnati

Houston

After the Wave took a 31–17 lead late in the 4th quarter, the Cougars scored a touchdown and then recovered an onside kick, driving into the red zone. On the last play of the game though, Parry Nickerson made his second interception of the night as time expired. With starters Sherman Badie and Lazedrick Thompson injured for the game, all 31 of the Green Wave's points were scored by true freshmen – Teddy Veal, Dontrell Hilliard, Leondre James, and Andrew DiRocco. The win snapped a 10-game losing streak to Houston, and an 18-game losing streak in games played outside the state of Louisiana.

Memphis

East Carolina

Temple

Awards

American Athletic Conference Weekly Honors
Week 1
Sherman Badie – Weekly Honor Roll

Week 3
Nico Marley – Weekly Honor Roll

Week 7
Darion Monroe – Weekly Honor Roll

Week 11
Parry Nickerson – Defensive Player of the Week
Dontrell Hilliard – Weekly Honor Roll
Tanner Lee – Weekly Honor Roll

References

Tulane
Tulane Green Wave football seasons
Tulane Green Wave football